John Gregovich (1847May 14, 1912) was a Serbian American merchant and Nevada Senator in the late 19th century. A member of the Silver Party during his tenure as senator, Gregovich later helped take on the cases of various Serbian immigrants living in Tonopah after a mine fire in 1911.

He was stabbed to death on May 14, 1912, by fellow immigrant Andriza Mircovich, who remains the only person executed by firing squad in the state of Nevada.

His house in Tonopah, the John Gregovich House, is a historic home listed on the National Register of Historic Places.

References

1847 births
1912 deaths
Nevada state senators
Nevada Silverites
American people of Serbian descent
Austro-Hungarian emigrants to the United States
Deaths by stabbing in Nevada
People murdered in Nevada
19th-century American politicians